Xavier Albó Corrons (4 November 1934 – 20 January 2023) was a Spanish Jesuit priest, linguist, and anthropologist, with expertise in the indigenous peoples and rural populations of Bolivia.

Biography
Albó was born in La Garriga, in Catalonia, Spain, and joined the Society of Jesus in 1951. In 1952, he moved to Bolivia and later became a naturalized citizen of the country. He was decorated with the Order of the Condor of the Andes, the highest civilian honor of the Bolivian state, on 6 April 2016.

Albó co-founded the Center for Research and Promotion of Farmers (Centro de Investigación y Promoción del Campesinado, CIPCA) in 1971. He served as its first director through 1976.

See also

References

1934 births
2023 deaths
Bolivian anthropologists
20th-century Spanish Jesuits
Spanish emigrants to Bolivia
Bolivian Roman Catholic priests
People from Vallès Oriental